Zhang Zixuan (born 6 February 1984) is a Chinese model and actress.

Zhang is noted for her role as Li Ke in the film Love Is Not Blind (2011).

Early life
Zhang was born and raised in Beijing, where she attended Beijing Union University, majoring in advertising planning.

Acting career
Zhang began her career as a fashion model in 2002, and signed with the modeled for the magazine Ray. 

Zhang gained fame for her starring role as Li Ke in the 2011 romantic comedy film Love Is Not Blind, which she received Hundred Flowers Award and Golden Horse Award nominations for Best New Performer.

For her role as Yi Na in the metropolitan drama Fashion Girl Editor (2012), Zhang was nominated for the Huading Award for Best New TV Actress.

In 2013, Zhang starred in the family-themed drama Little Daddy with Wen Zhang and Ma Yili. She played the title role in the television series I Am Hao Congming. 

In 2014, Zhang co-starred with Yang Mi and Shawn Yue in V Love. She also starred in the youth film Fleet of Time. 

In 2015, Zhang starred in the comedy series Laughter Medical Center and medical drama Grow Up.

Filmography

Film

Television series

Awards and nominations

References

External links

1984 births
Chinese female models
Living people
Chinese television actresses
Chinese film actresses
Beijing Union University alumni
Actresses from Beijing
21st-century Chinese actresses